King Hui of Chu (died 432 BC) was the king of the State of Chu from 488 BC to 432 BC during the Spring and Autumn period of ancient China.  He was born Xiong Zhang and King Hui was his posthumous title.  He was succeeded by his son, King Jian of Chu.

In the tenth year of his reign (478 BC), the Duke of Bai staged a coup d'état, killing Prime Minister Zixi and Chief Military Commander Ziqi, and abducting King Hui.  Shen Zhuliang, Duke of Ye, led his army to the capital, defeated Bai, and restored King Hui's rule.  The Duke of Bai committed suicide.

References

Monarchs of Chu (state)
Chinese kings
5th-century BC Chinese monarchs
Year of birth unknown
432 BC deaths